Zhaimai is one of the biggest villages in Senapati district in  Manipur state, India. The biggest river of manipur, the Barak River, starts from the village. The number of households is about 1492.

References

Senapati district